Culverden is a small town in the northern Canterbury region of New Zealand's South Island. It lies at the centre of the Amuri Plain. Culverden has traditionally been surrounded by sheep farms. Dairy farms have now become more common as a result of irrigation schemes in the area. The Waiau Plains Irrigation Scheme was completed in 1980. It provides irrigation to 17,000 hectares of farmland and the Balmoral Scheme provides irrigation to a further 5500 hectares.  The Rutherford Reserve and the Culverden Recreation Reserve are on the southern side of Culverden and the Culverden Golf Course in on the northern entrance to Culverden. There is a memorial in the Rutherford Reserve to Dr Charles Little who died in November 1918 from the Spanish Flu. He was the county doctor providing medical services from Waikari to Waiau.

Local government
When provincial government was abolished in 1876, Culverden became the main centre for the newly established Amuri County. Counties were abolished in the 1989 local government reforms, and since then, Culverden has belonged to the Hurunui District.

Demographics
Culverden is included in Amuri statistical area.

Culverden had a population of 351 at the 2018 New Zealand census, a decrease of 15 people (-4.1%) since the 2013 census, and an increase of 6 people (1.7%) since the 2006 census. There were 153 households. There were 159 males and 192 females, giving a sex ratio of 0.83 males per female, with 72 people (20.5%) aged under 15 years, 63 (17.9%) aged 15 to 29, 159 (45.3%) aged 30 to 64, and 54 (15.4%) aged 65 or older.

Ethnicities were 89.7% European/Pākehā, 10.3% Māori, 7.7% Asian, and 1.7% other ethnicities (totals add to more than 100% since people could identify with multiple ethnicities).

Although some people objected to giving their religion, 40.2% had no religion, 47.9% were Christian, 0.9% were Buddhist and 3.4% had other religions.

Of those at least 15 years old, 36 (12.9%) people had a bachelor or higher degree, and 84 (30.1%) people had no formal qualifications. The employment status of those at least 15 was that 150 (53.8%) people were employed full-time, 42 (15.1%) were part-time, and 3 (1.1%) were unemployed.

Amuri statistical area

Amuri had a population of 2,223 at the 2018 New Zealand census, an increase of 126 people (6.0%) since the 2013 census, and an increase of 222 people (11.1%) since the 2006 census. There were 834 households. There were 1,173 males and 1,047 females, giving a sex ratio of 1.12 males per female. The median age was 34.4 years (compared with 37.4 years nationally), with 507 people (22.8%) aged under 15 years, 417 (18.8%) aged 15 to 29, 1,056 (47.5%) aged 30 to 64, and 246 (11.1%) aged 65 or older.

Ethnicities were 82.9% European/Pākehā, 10.8% Māori, 0.8% Pacific peoples, 11.3% Asian, and 3.4% other ethnicities (totals add to more than 100% since people could identify with multiple ethnicities).

The proportion of people born overseas was 21.7%, compared with 27.1% nationally.

Although some people objected to giving their religion, 49.5% had no religion, 40.2% were Christian, 1.2% were Hindu, 0.3% were Muslim and 2.4% had other religions.

Of those at least 15 years old, 303 (17.7%) people had a bachelor or higher degree, and 327 (19.1%) people had no formal qualifications. The median income was $38,600, compared with $31,800 nationally. The employment status of those at least 15 was that 1,047 (61.0%) people were employed full-time, 297 (17.3%) were part-time, and 30 (1.7%) were unemployed.

Transport
State Highway 7 passes through Culverden, forming the town's main street.

Culvenden was also once an important railway terminus, with the railway line extended from Medbury across the Hurunui River to Culverden on 8 February 1886. It was envisaged that this route would become the Main North Line to Nelson and Blenheim, but a coastal route via Parnassus and Kaikoura was chosen instead. Nonetheless, the branch line to Culverden was extended beyond the town to Waiau in 1919 and it became known as the Waiau Branch. At the line's peak, when it was considered to be part of the Main North Line, multiple trains ran daily between Culverden and Christchurch, including the Culverden Express and a number of slower mixed trains that carried both freight and passengers. However, regular passenger services were replaced by buses on 29 January 1939 and after becoming uneconomic, the railway through Culverden was closed entirely on 15 January 1978. Little now remains of the town's railway except a loading bank at the site of the old station.

Education
Amuri Area School is the sole school in Culverden, catering for Year 1 to 13 students (ages 5 to 18), with a roll of approximately  students.

Notable Buildings

Amuri County Offices 

This was designed in a Georgian style. It was earthquake damaged and the Hurunui District Council was looking at repairing and strengthening the building.  It was for sale in October 2020.

Amuri Co-operating Church 
The Amuri Co-operating Church, formerly Saint Andrews Presbyterian Church, Culverden, It has a stained glass window entitled "Christ the Shepherd and Sheep Farmer", designed by Beverley Shore Bennett and 
executed by Roy Miller in 1973.

Mockett Motors 
Mockett Motors is designed in a Art Deco style. The business has been present in Culverden for over 100 years,

Notable people
Cricketer Amy Satterthwaite (born 1986) grew up in Culverden.

Sport 
The Kaiwara Classic Mountain Bike Race starts in Culverden and Cheviot via the Kaiwara Road.

References

External links 

Information about and photos of Culverden's railway station

Populated places in Canterbury, New Zealand
Hurunui District